The battle of Konzoula was a conflict which takes place during the period of "Zemene Mesafint" the between Dejazmach Goshu prince of Gojjam and his son Birru against the sons of Dejazmach Conefo. 

Dejazmach Conefo was the governor of Dembiya region subordinated to Ras Ali. Upon his death, Ras Ali decided to return the region to the government of Birru Goshu, the son of Goshu Zewde. The sons of Conefo, lij Yilma and lij Makonnen rebel and confront the troops of Birru on October 4, 1839.

This battle was short and not very lethal, the troops of Goshu Zewde quickly took the advantage, the right wing was led by Birru Goshu who managed, even if surrounded by the opposing army, to firmly maintain the infantry. The left wing was however broken by incessant charges led by the cavalry of the sons of Conefo, but the army of Goshu succeeded in defeating the center of the opposing army which resulted in the flight of the latter.

References 

Battles involving Ethiopia
Battles of the Zemene Mesafint
1839 in Ethiopia
Conflicts in 1839
October 1839 events